Tuska Mahallehye Qasemabad (also as Tuskā; also known as Tuskā Maḩalle) is a village in Owshiyan Rural District, Chaboksar District, Rudsar County, Gilan Province, Iran. At the 2006 census, its population was 444, in 117 families.

References 

Populated places in Rudsar County